is a railway station operated by Meitetsu's  Tokoname Line located in Minami Ward, Nagoya, Aichi Prefecture,  Japan. It is located 2.4 rail kilometers from the terminus of the line at Jingū-mae Station.

History
Dōtoku Station was opened on February 18, 1912, as a station on the Aichi Electric Railway Company. The Aichi Electric Railway became part of the Meitetsu group on August 1, 1935. The station was closed in 1944, and reopened in October 1949. From 1983 to 1984, the tracks were elevated. On January 15, 2005, the Tranpass system of magnetic fare cards with automatic turnstiles was implemented.

Lines
Meitetsu
Tokoname Line

Layout
Dōtoku Station has one elevated island platform.

Platforms

Adjacent stations

External links
  Meitetsu Station information

Notes

Railway stations in Aichi Prefecture
Railway stations in Japan opened in 1912
Stations of Nagoya Railroad